Raymond Wieczorek Drive (RW Drive) is a  road in Bedford, Manchester, and Londonderry, New Hampshire, connecting the Everett Turnpike to the Manchester–Boston Regional Airport. The road is named for Raymond Wieczorek, a five-term mayor of Manchester. The road opened to the public on November 10, 2011.

Route description
Raymond Wieczorek Drive begins at an interchange in Bedford on the Everett Turnpike, adjacent to the Bedford Toll Plaza. The drive passes under the turnpike, then comes to an interchange with U.S. Route 3 (South River Road). The drive then crosses the Pearl Harbor Memorial Bridge over a set of railroad tracks, the Merrimack River, and New Hampshire Route 3A (Brown Avenue), entering the city of Manchester at the midpoint of the river. The drive, immediately when the bridge ends, enters the town of Londonderry. The drive then passes through a traffic-light controlled intersection with Roundstone Drive and Pettengill Road (opened December 21, 2015), then crosses the Sora-Currier USMC Memorial Bridge over a small valley. The drive passes through a roundabout intersecting Commerce Avenue and Executive Drive. Raymond Wieczorek Drive ends at a second roundabout, intersecting Airport Road and Galaxy Way.

Major intersections

References

External links
 Raymond Wieczorek Drive on Flickr

New Hampshire highways
Transportation in Hillsborough County, New Hampshire
Transportation in Rockingham County, New Hampshire
Bridges over the Merrimack River